Jeff Whitham served as a Republican member of the Kansas House of Representatives, representing the 123rd district 2007–2011.

Prior to his election to the House, Whitham served as mayor and on the city commission of Garden City.  He has worked as President and CEO of Western State Bank since 1983.

Whitham is a graduate of Kansas State University and earned his Doctorate in Law from Washburn Law School.

Committee membership
 Appropriations
 General Government Budget
 Judiciary (Vice-Chair)
 Rules and Journal
 Select Committee on the Kansas Public Employee Retirement System {KPERS}
 Joint Committee on Pensions, Investments and Benefits

Major donors
The top 5 donors to Whitham's 2008 campaign:
 Whitham, Jeff $4,000
 Kansas Assoc of Realtors $1,000
 Singularis Group $749
 Unknown Contributor $125
 Gigot, Terry $100

References

External links
 Official website
 Kansas Legislature - Jeff Whitham
 Project Vote Smart profile
 Kansas Votes profile
 State Surge - Legislative and voting track record
 Campaign contributions: 2006, 2008

Republican Party members of the Kansas House of Representatives
Living people
People from Garden City, Kansas
Mayors of places in Kansas
Year of birth missing (living people)